Bert Grund (1920–1992) was a German composer of film scores.

Selected filmography
 Crown Jewels (1950)
 Immortal Light (1951)
 I Can't Marry Them All (1952)
 We're Dancing on the Rainbow (1952)
 My Wife Is Being Stupid (1952)
 Knall and Fall as Detectives (1952)
 The Bachelor Trap (1953)
 The Bird Seller (1953)
 The Immortal Vagabond (1953)
 The Sun of St. Moritz (1954)
 The Witch (1954)
 The Major and the Bulls (1955)
 Operation Sleeping Bag (1955)
 Love's Carnival (1955)
 The Marriage of Doctor Danwitz (1956)
 Between Time and Eternity (1956)
 That Won't Keep a Sailor Down (1958)
 Arena of Fear (1959)
 The Thousand Eyes of Dr. Mabuse (1960)
 The Count of Luxemburg (1972)
 Mathias Sandorf (1979, TV series)
 Die Wächter (1986, TV miniseries)
 Carmen on Ice (1990)

References

Bibliography

External links

1920 births
1992 deaths
German composers
Musicians from Dresden